Hayrettin Onur Karaoğuz (born 1 January 1984) is a Turkish comedian, showman, actor and advertising star.

Filmography

Movies
 Kızsız Adam (2009) as Alper
 Gelecekten Bir Gün (2010) as Tolga
 Vezir Parmağı (2017) as Cumali
 İlk Öpücük (2017) as Necati

TV series
 Kalk Gidelim (2018–) as Ercan
 Menajerimi Ara (2020) as himself

TV programs
 Hayrettin (Star TV) (2011–2012)
 Harry (ATV) (2013)

Commercials
 Turkcell - Kisa Mesaj Kampanyası (2009)
 Doritos - Hisseli Tatlar Kampanyası (2010)
 Nesine.com (2012)
 Fanta (2013–2014)
 Çabuk Çorba (2015)

References

External links 
 

Living people
Turkish male film actors
1984 births
People from Bakırköy
Kadir Has University alumni
Turkish comedians
Turkish male television actors
21st-century Turkish male actors